Ranjana Baghel is a Bharatiya Janata Party politician from Madhya Pradesh. She is a member of Madhya Pradesh Legislative Assembly and has served as minister for women and child welfare of the state.

On December 20, 2008 she was elected as MLA after winning Legislative Assembly elections in Manawar (Dhar) with 11,021 votes. She was a cabinet minister in Government of Madhya Pradesh holding the portfolio of Women and Child Development.

See also
 Sixteenth Legislative Assembly of Uttar Pradesh
 Uttar Pradesh Legislative Assembly

References

Living people
State cabinet ministers of Madhya Pradesh
Madhya Pradesh MLAs 2008–2013
Bharatiya Janata Party politicians from Maharashtra
Bharatiya Janata Party politicians from Madhya Pradesh
21st-century Indian women politicians
21st-century Indian politicians
Women state cabinet ministers of India
Year of birth missing (living people)
Women members of the Madhya Pradesh Legislative Assembly